Uruphong is a four way intersection and neighbourhood in Thailand. It is in the areas of the Thung Phaya Thai and Thanon Phetchaburi sub-districts which are the part of the Ratchathewi district in downtown Bangkok. It connects the Rama VI and Phetchaburi roads beneath both a footbridge and also to the expressway. It's considered to be the first part of Phetchaburi road and is near the Yommarat railway halt, Ministry of Foreign Affairs, Phaya Thai Palace, Ramathibodi Hospital, Phramongkutklao Hospital and Victory Monument.

Its name comes from a bridge which was historically located across a nearby canal. It was a bridge built to commemorate Prince Urubongs Rajsombhoj, one of the sons of King Chulalongkorn (Rama V), who died when he was a child. Later on, the bridge and the canal were both demolished to make way for Phetchaburi road, but the name "Uruphong" still exists today.

Between October 10th and November 7th, 2013, this intersection was used as a protest site for the Yingluck Shinawatra government by the Network of Students and People for Reform of Thailand (NSPRT). These are separate organizations from the People’s Movement to Overthrow the Thaksin Regime (Pefot) and the Dharma Army. NSPRT was led by a group of Ramkhamhaeng University students. Subsequently, they are also considered to be a fact on the People's Democratic Reform Committee (PDRC).

References 

Neighbourhoods of Bangkok
Road junctions in Bangkok
Ratchathewi district